James Diodati is a Canadian politician who has been serving as the 23rd and current mayor of Niagara Falls since December 2010.  

He was first elected in the 2010 municipal election, defeating incumbent mayor Ted Salci. Prior to his election to the mayoralty, Diodati served on the Niagara Falls City Council for two terms, a total of seven years. He is currently serving his third term on the Niagara Regional Council. 

Diodati has been self-employed throughout his time serving on the Niagara Falls City Council and while serving as mayor of Niagara Falls. He operates a web-based health and wellness direct marketing business. 

Diodati has an extensive volunteer history, including serving on Niagara Catholic District School Board (NCDSB) Accommodation Review Committee and its Vision 20/20 Advisory Committee. He also established the 'Sleep Cheap, Charities Reap' fundraising event, which has raised more than $1.8M for local charities.

He and his wife, Yvonne (Benyo) Diodati have three children.

References 

Canadian people of Italian descent
1965 births
Living people
Mayors of Niagara Falls, Ontario